WEZB (97.1 FM) is a commercial radio station licensed to New Orleans, Louisiana. Owned by Audacy, Inc., it broadcasts a Top 40 (CHR) radio format.  It rarely uses its call sign, instead calling itself B97 FM.  The studios and offices are located at the 400 Poydras Tower in Downtown New Orleans.  The station airs the syndicated Kidd Kraddick Morning Show from KHKS Dallas on weekdays.

WEZB has an effective radiated power (ERP) of 100,000 watts.  The transmitter site is off Behrman Highway in the city's Algiers neighborhood.  The signal covers much of Southeastern Louisiana and Southwestern Mississippi.  WEZB broadcasts in the HD Radio hybrid format.

History
On September 1, 1945, 97.1 signed on the air as WRCM, the FM simulcast of WJMR (990 AM; WGSO) and sister station to WJMR-TV (now WVUE), all owned by George J. Mayoral. Then, around 1966–67 after the TV station had already been sold, the Supreme Broadcasting Company bought the two radio stations and changed the call signs to WNNR and WNNR-FM.  At the time, the stations were located in the Jung Hotel at 1500 Canal Street in downtown New Orleans.  WNNR-FM had a power of only 20,500 watts from an antenna 310 feet atop the building, a fraction of its current wattage and antenna height.

On January 2, 1972, EZ Communications acquired the FM station.  It became WEZB, part of a chain of Beautiful Music stations such as WEZC Charlotte, WEZR Washington and others owned by EZ.  While it was profitable, it was not able to best WWL-FM (now WLMG) in the easy listening format.  Briefly in the 1970s when disco music became a popular genre, 97.1 became "Disco 97 FM" on February 8, 1979. However, the disco era was short, with WEZB switching to a rhythmic contemporary format, called FM 97, The Rhythm Of The City. "We had a big party in the Atrium at the Hyatt Regency Hotel", says Jimmy Roberts, B97 FM's first "BJ", the station's version of a DJ.  On January 1, 1980, "Baby New Year was dropped from the ceiling and we switched over from being FM 97, The Rhythm Of The City to The New B97 FM."

According to Jackson "Jack Da Wack" Tally, who was also one of B97 FM's first Bee Jocks, in early November 1979, the station slowly started to work more Top 40 music into the playlist and scaled back the rhythmic titles.  By the end of that year, the staff was ready for the format change to B97 FM.  This station would be a popular Top 40 outlet for years to come, much like "The Mighty 690, WTIX" was in the 1960s and 1970s.

Kent Burkhart, consultant to EZ Communications at the time, states on his website that Dan Vallie was hired on by the company to change the ailing format of WEZB from disco and dance music to Top 40.  Over the years, the name went through minor changes (i.e., "The New B97 FM", "New Orleans' B97 FM", "B97 FM", "97.1 The All New B-97 FM", and "B97 FM, All The Hits!"), the transmitting power was increased, and the antenna was moved to a taller location.

B97 has been New Orleans' top rated Top 40 outlet for more than 40 years, except for two brief, failed experiments.  The first format change was a decision by now-defunct EZ Communications, in which the station changed to a hot talk format in the summer of 1994.  It featured The Howard Stern Show and other edgy talk programs.  The decision to return to a music format came in Spring 1996.  On June 7, 1996, the station stunted by playing Billy Ray Cyrus' "Achy Breaky Heart" repeatedly for seven hours.  At noon that day, the station launched a hot adult contemporary/Adult Top 40 format using the same name "B97 FM."  The first song was Hootie & the Blowfish's "Only Wanna Be With You".  On July 26, 1998, WEZB returned to its heritage Top 40/CHR format, albeit with a rhythmic lean. In 2002, it returned to its current, mainstream Top 40 approach.

In 1999, Sinclair Broadcast Group sold WEZB and 45 other radio stations to Entercom for $824.5 million.

Hurricane Katrina
WEZB was also a member of the United Radio Broadcasters of New Orleans, an alliance of broadcast stations formed by the joint ventures of WEZB's parent company, Entercom Communications with Clear Channel Communications, during Hurricane Katrina in September 2005.

Past programming and staff
Notable former programs include The Howard Stern Show. Notable former on-air personalities include program director Elvis Duran sports reporter Bernard "Buddy" Diliberto.1979-1980 Middays 10am-2pm Kenneth Weeks om air talent. 2pm- 6pm Terry Young. 1982-1987 Boomer 6-10pm and Dedication Party host.

References

External links

 WEZB audio clip from 1992

WEZB
Contemporary hit radio stations in the United States
Radio stations established in 1945
1945 establishments in Louisiana
Audacy, Inc. radio stations